Crenicichla urosema is a species of cichlid native to South America. It is found in the Amazon River basin, in the Tapajós River at São Luiz, Brazil.

References

urosema
Freshwater fish of Brazil
Fish of the Amazon basin
Taxa named by Sven O. Kullander
Fish described in 1990